The Budyonnovsk hospital hostage crisis took place from 14 to 19 June 1995, when a group of 80 to 200 Chechen separatists led by Shamil Basayev attacked the southern Russian city of Budyonnovsk, some  north of the border with the breakaway Chechen Republic of Ichkeria. The attack resulted in a ceasefire between Russia and Chechen separatists, and peace talks (which later failed) between Russia and the Chechens.

Initial attack
Basayev's men crossed into Stavropol Krai concealed in a column of military trucks. At about noon on 14 June, they stormed the main police station and the city hall, where they raised Chechen flags over government offices.

After several hours after Russian reinforcements, the Chechens retreated to the residential district and regrouped in the city hospital. There they took hostage between 1,500 and 1,800 people (some estimates reaching as high as 2,000 or even 2,500), most of them civilians (including about 150 children and a number of women with newborn infants). On their way to the hospital, they shot 100 civilians that refused to cooperate.

Hostage crisis
Basayev issued an ultimatum, threatening to kill the hostages unless his demands were met. These included an end to the First Chechen War, and direct negotiations by Russia with the Chechen representatives. Also, Basayev demanded that the Russian authorities bring reporters to the scene and allow them to enter the Chechen position in the hospital. Russian president Boris Yeltsin immediately vowed to do everything possible to free the hostages, denouncing the attack as "unprecedented in cynicism and cruelty".

At about 8 pm on 15 June, the Chechens killed a hostage. When the reporters did not arrive at the arranged time, five other hostages were shot to death on Basayev's order. The New York Times quoted the hospital's chief doctor that "several of the Chechens had just grabbed five hostages at random and shot them to show the world they were serious in their demands that Russian troops leave their land."

Security Minister Sergei Stepashin called the reports of the execution "a bluff".

After three days of siege, the Russian authorities ordered the security forces to retake the hospital compound. The forces employed were MVD police ("militsiya") and Internal Troops, along with spetsnaz (special forces) from the Federal Security Service (FSB), including the elite Alpha Group. The strike force attacked the hospital compound at dawn on the fourth day, meeting fierce resistance. After several hours of fighting in which many hostages were killed by crossfire, a local ceasefire was agreed on and 227 hostages were released; 61 others were freed by the Russian troops.

A second Russian attack on the hospital a few hours later also failed, and so did a third, resulting in even more casualties. The Russian authorities accused the Chechens of using the hostages as human shields. Yeltsin's human rights advisor Sergey Kovalyov described the scene: "In half an hour the hospital was burning, and it was not until the next morning that we found out what happened there as a result of this shooting. I saw with my own eyes pieces of human flesh stuck to the walls and the ceiling and burned corpses".

Resolution of the crisis
On 18 June, negotiations between Basayev and Russian prime minister Viktor Chernomyrdin led to a compromise which became a turning point for the First Chechen War. In exchange for release of the hostages, Russia agreed to halt military actions in Chechnya and begin negotiations.

Yeltsin meanwhile had gone to the summit of the Group of Eight in Halifax, Canada. After meeting with Yeltsin, the Group of Eight condemned violence on both sides of the Chechen conflict. When asked about the crisis by a journalist, Yeltsin denounced the rebels as ″horrible bandits with black bands on their foreheads″ (″Это оголтелые бандиты, понимаешь, с чёрными повязками″).

On 19 June, most of the hostages were released. Basayev's group, with 120 volunteer hostages (including 16 journalists and nine State Duma deputies), traveled uneventfully to the village of Zandak, inside Chechnya, near the border with Dagestan. The remaining hostages were then released; Basayev, accompanied by some of the journalists, went to the village of Dargo, where he was welcomed as a hero.

The raid is widely seen as having been the turning point in the war. It boosted morale among Chechen separatists, shocked the Russian public, and discredited the Russian government. The initiated negotiations gave the hostage-takers the critically needed time to rest and rearm. Until the end of the conflict, the Russian forces never regained the initiative.

Casualties and damage
According to official figures, 129 civilians were killed and 415 were injured in the entire event (of whom 18 later died of their wounds). This includes at least 105 hostage fatalities. However, according to an independent estimate 166 hostages were killed and 541 injured in the special forces attack on the hospital. At least 11 Russian police officers and 14 soldiers were killed. A report submitted by Russia to the Council of Europe stated that 130 civilians, 18 policemen, and 18 soldiers were killed, and more than 400 people were wounded.

Over 160 buildings in the town were destroyed or damaged, including 54 municipal buildings and 110 private houses. Many of the former hostages suffered psychological traumas and were treated at a new facility in Budyonnovsk.

Political aftermath
The government's handling of the Budyonnovsk was perceived as inept by many Russians. The State Duma, the lower house of the Russian Parliament passed a motion of no confidence by 241 to 72. However, this was seen as purely symbolic, and the government did not resign. Still, the debacle cost both Stepashin and interior minister Viktor Yerin their jobs; they resigned on 30 June 1995.

Basayev's force suffered 11 men killed and one missing; most of their bodies were returned to Chechnya in a freezer truck. In the years following the hostage taking, more than 40 of the surviving attackers have been tracked down and killed, including Aslambek Abdulkhadzhiev in 2002 and Basayev himself in 2006, and more than 20 were sentenced by the Stavropol territorial court to various terms of imprisonment.

See also

 Beslan school hostage crisis
 First Chechen War
 Kizlyar-Pervomayskoye hostage crisis
 List of hostage crises
 Moscow theater hostage crisis

References

External links
 Was It Just a Warning Shot? Pavel Felgenhauer, The Moscow Times, 31 October 2002
 Chechen rebels' hostage history BBC News, 1 September 2004
 The Rise Of Russia's 'Terrorist No. 1' Radio Free Europe/Radio Liberty, 28 June 2006
 12th anniversary of Basayev's raid on Budyonnovsk Prague Watchdog, 15 June 2007

1995 mass shootings in Asia
1995 mass shootings in Europe
1995 murders in Russia
20th-century mass murder in Russia
Attacks on buildings and structures in 1995
Attacks on buildings and structures in Russia
Attacks on hospitals
Boris Yeltsin
First Chechen War
Hostage taking in Russia
Islamic terrorism in Russia
Islamic terrorist incidents in 1995
June 1995 crimes
June 1995 events in Russia
Mass murder in 1995
Mass shootings in Russia
Massacres in Russia
Stavropol Krai
Terrorist incidents in Russia in 1995